MPHL may refer to:
 Maritime Professional Hockey League, professional ice hockey league from 1911 to 1914
 Manitoba Hockey Association, ice hockey league later known as the "Manitoba Professional Hockey League"
 Male-pattern hair loss, a type of pattern hair loss